Charles Erskine also spelled Areskine (1680 – 5 April 1763), of Tinwald and Barjarg, Dumfries, and Alva, Clackmannan was Lord Advocate, a Scottish judge, and a politician who sat in the House of Commons from 1722 to 1742.

Life 

Erskine was the fourth son of Sir Charles Erskine, 1st Baronet, of Alva, Clackmannanshire and his wife Christian Dundas, daughter of Sir James Dundas, Lord Arniston. His older brothers included Robert Erskine, physician to Peter the Great. Charles was educated at the High School of Edinburgh and studied Law at Edinburgh University from 1693. At the age of 20 he was a candidate for the office of one of the four Regents of the University of Edinburgh, and after an examination with several competitors obtained that appointment on 26 November 1700 until 17 October 1707. On 7 November he was appointed the first Professor of Public Law in the university in 1707, despite the protests of the council. He was at Utrecht in about 1710 and became a member of the Faculty of Advocates on 14 July 1711.
 
Erskine was elected Member of Parliament for Dumfriesshire in 1722, 1727 and 1734, for the Dumfries Burghs in 1734, for the Tain Burghs in 1741. He was Solicitor General for Scotland from 2 June 1725, Lord Advocate from 20 January 1737 to 1742. He was raised as a Lord of Justiciary, and also to the bench on 23 November 1744 as Lord Tinwald. He was also Lord Justice Clerk from 15 June 1748 until his death.

In 1749 he purchased Alva House from his nephew and enlarged and remodelled the property. His Edinburgh property at this time (required to attend the Edinburgh courts) was at Mylne's Square, opposite the Tron Kirk 200m east of the courts.

In 1755 he purchased Drumsheugh House west of Edinburgh. He commissioned James Adam to extend the property and refront in a more modern idiom. The house was two storey and basement in form. The house was demolished to create Drumsheugh Place.

Family
He married Grizel Grierson, daughter of John Grierson of Barjarg on 21 December 1712. Through whom he inherited Barjarg Tower.

Erskine married as his second wife Elizabeth Maxwell, widow of Dr. William Maxwell of Preston, Lancashire, and daughter of William Harestanes of Craigs, Kirkcudbright on 26 August 1753. He died at Edinburgh on 5 April 1763 leaving two sons by his first wife:
James Erskine, Lord Alva
Charles Erskine (1716–1749) was also a lawyer, and MP for Ayr Burghs from 1747 to 1749.
Erskine's brother Sir John Erskine was also an MP.

In Fiction
Charles Erskine, Lord Tinwald, features as a character in Andrew Drummond's fantasy novel, "The Books of the Incarceration of the Lady Grange (2016).

References

 An Historical Account of the Senators of the College of Justice of Scotland'', by Sir David Dalrymple of Hailes, Bt., with some further editing and additions, Edinburgh, 1849.

1680 births
1763 deaths
17th-century Scottish people
18th-century Scottish people
Members of the Parliament of Great Britain for Scottish constituencies
British MPs 1722–1727
British MPs 1727–1734
British MPs 1734–1741
British MPs 1741–1747
Lord Advocates
Tinwald
Academics of the University of Edinburgh
Members of the Faculty of Advocates
Solicitors General for Scotland
Younger sons of baronets
Charles